The 1967–68 Cypriot Cup was the 26th edition of the Cypriot Cup. A total of 21 clubs entered the competition. It began with the first round on 8 June 1968 and concluded on 7 July 1968 with the final which was held at GSP Stadium (1902). APOEL won their 6th Cypriot Cup trophy after beating EPA 2–1 in the final.

Sources

See also
 Cypriot Cup
 1967–68 Cypriot First Division

Cypriot Cup seasons
1967–68 domestic association football cups
1967–68 in Cypriot football